The Pakistan Standards & Quality Control Authority (PSQCA) is an autonomous body subordinate to the ministry of science and technology of the Government of Pakistan. Its main objective is to regulate and enforce quality standards in Pakistan. Anything that is certified by the PSQCA is issued the Pakistan Standards label.

History
The PSQCA was formed through the passage of the Pakistan Standards and Quality Control Authority Act, 1996 by the Parliament of Pakistan.

On Feb 16, 2022, the Senate Standing Committee on Science and Technology approved transfer of head office of Pakistan Standards and Quality Control Authority (PSQCA) to Islamabad from Karachi.

Organization 
The Authority is composed of the following four departments:

Standards Development Center 
The Directorate of Standards, also known as Standards Development Centre, SDC is responsible for the development of Pakistan Standards, adoption of International Standards by consensus involving Stakeholders (manufacturers, government and regulatory bodies, consumers, scientists and technologists, academia and testing laboratories) through its technical divisions.

Organization 
SDC has 177 Technical Committees along with 12 technical divisions. Technical divisions are:
 Agriculture and Food Division
 Automobile Division (formed; 2014)
 Chemical Division
 Civil Division
 Electrical Division
 Electronics Division
 Halaal Division
 Information Technology (IT) and Information Communication Technology (ICT), Division 
 Management Standards System (MSS)
 Mechanical Division
 Textile Division
 Weights & Measure Division

Achievements 
SDC has established 6094 Pakistan Standards, and adopted 9185 ISO, 6202 IEC, 2 OIML, 634 ASTM, 21 Codex Alimentarius (CAC) and 15 Food and Agriculture Organization (FAO) Standards.

Quality Control Center 
The Quality Control Centre (QCC) is a multifunctional testing laboratory which test quality of food, building materials (cement), papers & textiles, sugar, Microbiology, beverages and Water. QCC is organized in six sections. It can test 107 different items, including 38 food, 28 electrical, 02 auto vehicles, 03 animal feed, 3 textile, 14 civil/building materials, 6 washing/cosmetics, 2 steel, 9 chemical division and 4 fertilizer items.

History 
The formal Central Testing Laboratory merged into Pakistan Standards Quality Control Authority under Act VI of 1996, after the Promulgation of the Pakistan Standards Quality Control Authority and was renamed as Quality Control Centre.
In 2014, all labs of Quality Control Centre(QCC Karachi) i.e. Microbiology, Water & beverages lab, Sugar Lab, Oil & Fats and Building Material (Cement) Lab were accredited.

Organization 
Quality control centers are located at Karachi (with chemical, microbiology and physical sections), Lahore (chemical, microbiology and physical sections), Peshawar (chemical, microbiology and physical sections) and Quetta (chemical section).

Technical Services Center

System Certifications Center

International activities

Affiliations 
PSQCA is a member of the following international organizations:

 International Organization for Standardization
 International Electrotechnical Commission
 International Organization of Legal Metrology
 World Trade Organization 
 IECEE/CEE

Relations with foreign nations and organisation 
PSQCA has memorandum of understandings (MoUs) with following countries:
 
 
 
 

PSQCA has established relations with following organizations:
 American National Standards Institute
 ASTM International
 Deutsches Institut für Normung

References

External links
 PSQCA official website
 Ministry of Science and Technology

Regulatory authorities of Pakistan
Quality control
Government agencies established in 1996
1996 establishments in Pakistan
Standards organisations in Pakistan